Cashmere A'keem Wright (born January 9, 1990) is a former American professional basketball player. He played college basketball with the Cincinnati Bearcats. Afterwards, he spent three seasons playing professionally in the Netherlands, Greece and Poland.

College career
Wright was named to the 2012 All- Big East tournament team with the Cincinnati Bearcats after unranked Cincinnati knocked off #2 Syracuse in the semifinals at Madison Square Garden. The Bearcats beat 15 ranked teams with Cashmere at the point guard position over his career (2009–13). Wright wore number 1 and is the all-time leader in steals (198) for Cincinnati. Wright is also the only player in Cincinnati history to record at least 1300 points, 475 assists and 175 steals.

Professional career

Netherlands (2013–14)

In July 2013 Wright signed his first pro-contract with the GasTerra Flames from Groningen, Netherlands. In March Wright won his first championship in the national NBB Cup, in the Final against Zorg en Zekerheid Leiden Wright went off for 19 points. Wright was 5th in the Dutch league in scoring, with 14.2 points per game and was 10th in assists with 3.6 per game. He got a place in the All-DBL Team after the regular season. On June 1, 2014 he won the Dutch championship as well.

Greece and Poland (2014–15)

For the 2014–15 season, Wright signed with AEK Athens of the Greek A1.  Wright was released by AEK on November 7, 2014. Wright signed with the Halifax Rainmen of NBL Canada but did not play. On January 6, 2015, he signed with Wilki Morskie Szczecin of the Polish Basketball League.

Return to the Netherlands (2015–2016)

On October 30, 2015, Wright was acquired by the Fort Wayne Mad Ants of the NBA Development League following a successful tryout with the team. However, he was waived on November 9 before playing for them.

On December 2, 2015, Wright returned to the Netherlands when he signed a 1,5-year contract with Zorg en Zekerheid Leiden.

On November 4, 2016, ZZ Leiden announced it had released Wright after he suffered from a season-ending knee injury.

Honors
Cincinnati (NCAA) 
MVP Global Sports Classic: 2012
All-Big East tournament Team: 2012

Donar
Dutch Cup: 2013–14
Dutch Basketball League: 2013–14
All-DBL Team: 2014
DBL All-Star: 2014

References

External links
Cincinnati profile

1990 births
Living people
AEK B.C. players
American expatriate basketball people in Greece
American expatriate basketball people in the Netherlands
American expatriate basketball people in Poland
American men's basketball players
B.S. Leiden players
Basketball players from Savannah, Georgia
Cincinnati Bearcats men's basketball players
Donar (basketball club) players
Dutch Basketball League players
Point guards
ZZ Leiden players